The Graduates may refer to:

 The Graduates (1986 film), Romanian film
 The Graduates (1995 film), Italian film
 The Graduates (2008 film), American film
 The Graduates, episode from The O.C. (season 3)#ep76
 The Graduates, a song on the album Foil Deer by Speedy Ortiz

See also
 The Graduate